CIH or cih may refer to:

 CIH (computer virus), also known as Chernobyl and Spacefiller
 CIH Bank, a wholly owned subsidiary of the Moroccan Caisse de dépôt et de gestion
 Capricorn Investment Holdings, a southern African umbrella for the Capricorn group of companies
 Certified Industrial Hygienist, professional credential for occupational hygienists in the United States
 IATA code for Changzhi Wangcun Airport
 The Chartered Institute of Housing, a UK-based professional society
 ISO 639-3 code for the Chinali language
 Opel cam-in-head engine, a series of vehicle engines
 Chromogenic immunohistochemistry